The Refectory Church is a refectory and an adjoining church of Saint Anthony and Theodosius of the medieval cave monastery of Kyiv Pechersk Lavra in Kyiv, the capital of Ukraine. In the refectory, the Lavra monks had their meals. The building was constructed in 1893-1895 at a time when more than a thousand monks were living within the monastery.

The sturdy dome of the church incorporates some aspects of ancient Byzantium. The interior decoration of the building was designed by Aleksey Shchusev. The marble icons are in the Neo-Russian style. The paintings in both the refectory and the church, painted in the beginning of the 20th century by Ivan Yizhakevych, G. Popov, among many others, contain a Modernist influence. In the rear of the refectory is viewing area, providing visitors with a panorama of the Near and Far Caverns, the Dnieper River, and the left-bank of the city.

In 1911 following the assassination of Pyotr Stolypin, the Russian politician's funeral service was held in the Refectory church and his grave is located in the Lavra.

In the 2022 Russian invasion of Ukraine, the continued use of the church by the Ukrainian Orthodox Church (Moscow Patriarchate) has been questioned, as the lease expired on 31 December 2022.

See also 
:Category:Burials at the Refectory Church, Kyiv Pechersk Lavra

References

External links 
 

Churches in Kyiv
Eastern Orthodox cathedrals in Ukraine
Kyiv Pechersk Lavra
Churches completed in 1895
19th-century Eastern Orthodox church buildings
Revival architecture in Ukraine
Church buildings with domes
1895 establishments in Ukraine